The Chicago Mustangs are an American professional indoor soccer team based at the Now Arena in the Chicago suburb of Hoffman Estates, Illinois. They play in the Eastern Conference of the Major Arena Soccer League 2 (M2).
They are also competing outdoors as members of the Midwest Premier League

History
The Mustangs were originally awarded an expansion franchise in the Professional Arena Soccer League on September 25, 2012. The team was originally coached by Narciso "Chicho" Cuevas until he was replaced on the bench late in the 2012–13 season by team owner Armando Gamboa.

The Mustangs won the PASL Championship in the 2013–14 season. They were undefeated in the regular season, setting a PASL record of 202 goals in a season. They earned the right to host the Final Four of the Ron Newman Cup playoffs, which they also claimed. They defeated the Cleveland Freeze 10–3 in the semifinals before stopping Hidalgo La Fiera 14–5 in the Newman Cup Final. That victory also earned the United States Open Cup for Arena Soccer title.
They became members of the Midwest Premier League on February 1, 2021, and will compete in the league's West Division following the 2021 MASL 2 season. The MAC Athletic Complex in Crystal Lake will host the MPL matches.

Personnel

Active players

Inactive players

Staff
 Armando Gamboa - Owner/CEO and Head Coach
 Dino Delevski - Assistant Coach
 Ermanno Rossi - Assistant Director of Soccer Operations/ Player Operations Manager

Front Office Staff:

 Ray Kincaid Jr. - Game Operations
 A.J. Collier II - Trainer 
 David Novoa - Graphic Artist

Year-by-year

Playoff record

Honors
2013–14 PASL Eastern Division Champions
2013–14 PASL Ron Newman Cup Champions
2013–14 U.S. Open Champions

Mustangs Premier
The Chicago Mustangs Premier are the minor league affiliate of the Mustangs, competing in the Premier Arena Soccer League. Mustangs Premier home games are played at Grand Sports Arena in Hoffman Estates, Illinois or Sears Centre.

In 2013–14, Mustangs Premier went undefeated in the regular season and went on to capture the PASL National Championship.

References

External links
 Official website

 
2012 establishments in Illinois
Association football clubs established in 2012
Indoor soccer clubs in the United States
Major Arena Soccer League teams
Professional Arena Soccer League teams
Soccer clubs in Chicago
Soccer clubs in Illinois
Hoffman Estates, Illinois